Viesturs Lukševics (born 16 April 1987) is a Latvian cyclist, who most recently rode for UCI Continental team .

Major results

2008
 7th Road race, National Road Championships
2009
 National Road Championships
1st  Under-23 road race
5th Road race
2010
 8th GP Betonexpressz 2000
2011
 5th Road race, National Road Championships
2012
 10th Overall Tour of Japan
2014
 6th Road race, National Road Championships
 6th Overall Tour of Fuzhou
2015
 1st  Mountains classification Tour of Estonia
 3rd Odessa Grand Prix 2
 6th Overall Podlasie Tour
 7th Road race, National Road Championships
2016
 2nd Road race, National Road Championships
 8th Overall Tour of Mersin
2017
 National Road Championships
3rd Road race
5th Time trial
 9th Memoriał Henryka Łasaka
 10th Velothon Wales
2018
 4th Road race, National Road Championships
2019
 6th Road race, National Road Championships
2020
 1st  Road race, National Road Championships

References

External links

1987 births
Living people
Latvian male cyclists
People from Kuldīga